Muaro Sijunjung is a town and district in Sijunjung Regency, of West Sumatra province of Indonesia and it is the seat (capital) of Sijunjung Regency.

Populated places in West Sumatra
Regency seats of West Sumatra